Wisser Bach is a river of North Rhine-Westphalia and Rhineland-Palatinate, Germany. It flows into the Sieg in Wissen.

See also
List of rivers of North Rhine-Westphalia
List of rivers of Rhineland-Palatinate

References

Rivers of North Rhine-Westphalia
Rivers of Rhineland-Palatinate
Rivers of Germany